A Dvarapala or Dvarapalaka (Sanskrit, "door guard";) is a door or gate guardian often portrayed as a warrior or fearsome giant, usually armed with a weapon - the most common being the  gada (mace). The dvarapala statue is a widespread architectural element throughout Hindu, Buddhist and Jaina cultures, as well as in areas influenced by them like Java.

Names
In most Southeast Asian languages (including Thai, Burmese,  Vietnamese, Khmer and Javanese), these protective figures are referred to as dvarapala. Sanskrit dvāra means "gate" or "door", and pāla means "guard" or "protector".

The related name in Indonesian and Malaysia is dwarapala. Equivalent door guardians in northern Asian languages are  Kongōrikishi or Niō  in Japanese, Heng Ha Er Jiang in Chinese, and Narayeongeumgang in Korean.

Origin and forms
Dvarapalas as an architectural feature have their origin in tutelary deities, like Yaksha and warrior figures, such as Acala, of the local popular religion. Today some dvarapalas are even figures of policemen or soldiers standing guard.

These statues were traditionally placed outside Buddhist or Hindu temples, as well as other structures like royal palaces, to protect the holy places inside. A dvarapala is usually portrayed as an armed fearsome guardian looking like a demon, but at the gates of Buddhist temples in Sri Lanka, dvarapalas often display average human features. In other instances a fierce-looking nāga snake figure may perform the same function. 

The sculptures in Java and Bali, usually carved from andesite, portray dvarapalas as fearsome giants with a rather bulky physique in semi kneeling position and holding a club. The traditional dvarapalas of Cambodia and Thailand, on the other hand, are leaner and portrayed in a standing position holding the club downward in the center.

The ancient sculpture of dvarapala in Thailand is made of a high-fired stoneware clay covered with a pale, almost milky celadon glaze. Ceramic sculptures of this type were produced in Thailand, during the Sukhothai and Ayutthaya periods, between the 14th and 16th centuries, at several kiln complexes located in northern Thailand. 

Depending on the size and wealth of the temple, the guardians could be placed singly, in pairs or in larger groups. Smaller structures may have had only one dvarapala. Often there was a pair placed on either side of the threshold to the shrine. Some larger sites may have had four (lokapālas, guardians of the four cardinal directions), eight, or 12. In some cases only the fierce face or head of the guardian is represented, a figure very common in the kratons in Java.

See also

Tutelary deity
Buddhist architecture
Hindu architecture
Lokapālas
Yaksha
Dharmapala
Nio

References

External links

 Between Worlds: Guardians in Tibet as Agents of Transformation
Glossary of Southeast Asian Art

Buddhist sculpture
Asian art
Tutelary deities
Architectural elements
Hindu temple architecture